Abrotanella nivigena is a member of the daisy family and ranges from southeast New South Wales to eastern Victoria, Australia.

References

nivigena
Flora of Australia
Taxa named by Ferdinand von Mueller